Alfred Solstas (January 23, 1884 – March 20, 1973) was an American farmer, businessman, and politician.

Solstad was born on a farm in Bygland Township, Polk County, Minnesota. He lived in Fisher, Minnesota, was a cattle farmer and was involved with the insurance business. Solstad served in the Minnesota Senate from 1935 to 1946. He died at Valley Memorial Home in Grand Forks, North Dakota.

References

1884 births
1973 deaths
People from Polk County, Minnesota
Businesspeople from Minnesota
Farmers from Minnesota
Minnesota state senators